The Greater Washington Community Foundation is a non-profit organization dedicated to charity donations in the Washington, D.C. area.

History 
In 1973 The Community Foundation was established by Katharine Graham, Robert Linowes, Hank Strong and other Washington leaders.

In 2017 the Foundation created the Resilience Fund in collaboration with the Eugene and Agnes E. Meyer Foundation and other contributors. The Resilience Fund make grants to organizations supporting people, who are affected by changes in immigration and deportation policies. The Fund also supports organizations, which effort to build community cohesion and combat anti-other sentiment.

In 2018, together with Mayor Muriel Bowser and the Interagency Council on Homelessness, the Foundation helped launch a partnership to end homelessness. It aims to create a platform for grants, policy and investment, which is focused on curbing homelessness by aligning public and private sector resources and strategies to increase supply of affordable housing.

In 2018 the Foundation granted more than $64 million to health and human services, neighborhood revitalization, arts and culture, education, reducing income inequality, workforce development programs and other causes. In the same year the organization reported $96.7 million revenue during its fiscal year (which ended in March 2018).

Till 2019 the Foundation was led by Neal Simon, chairman of the board, and Bruce McNamer, President and CEO. On September 27, 2019, Katharine Weymouth stepped into the role of board chair. Weymouth is the granddaughter of Katharine Graham, who served on the foundation's board. Tonia Wellons was named as Interim President and CEO of the Foundation.

Engagement 
In 2008 the Foundation founded the Neighbors in Need Fund. The fund had more than $4.7 million in grants and helped over 100,000 people in need.

In July 2017 The Community Foundation for the National Capital Region changed its name to the Greater Washington Community Foundation. .

In June 2019 the Community Foundation announced a partnership with the District of Columbia in an effort to end homelessness in Washington D.C. To launch an impact investment option, the foundation committed $5 million in a combined investment fund.

References

External links 

 Official website

Organizations established in 1973
Community foundations based in the United States
Foundations based in Washington, D.C.